Abdelkader Benayada (born May 5, 1982, in Frenda) is an Algerian footballer who plays for MC Saïda in the Algerian Ligue Professionnelle 2.

Club career
On June 9, 2009, Benayada signed a two-year contract with USM Alger.

International career
Benayada was a member of the Algerian Under-23 National Team in 2003 and 2004. He played at the 2003 All-Africa Games in Nigeria and in the qualifiers for the 2004 Summer Olympics, making a total of 8 appearances.

References

External links
 
 

1982 births
Living people
People from Frenda
Algerian footballers
Algeria under-23 international footballers
Algerian Ligue Professionnelle 1 players
Algerian Ligue 2 players
ASM Oran players
MC Oran players
MO Constantine players
USM Alger players
USM Blida players
Association football defenders
21st-century Algerian people